Ignacio Ezequiel Agustín Fernández Carballo (born 25 July 2002), mostly known as Equi Fernandez, is an Argentine footballer currently playing as a midfielder for Boca Juniors.

Biography 
Fernández started to play in Boca Juniors in 2012, after an agreement signed with FC Barcelona through which both clubs committed to colaborate together in youth players training. He debuted as professional in May 2021, when Boca Juniors was defeated by Patronato 1–0, where he stayed 60 minutes on field. 
 
He was traded to Tigre in February 2022 on loan for a year. The transaction completed for E450,000. Fernández played a total of 14 matches with that club. After the loan expired, Fernández returned to Boca Juniors in 2023.

Argentina 
Fernández was called up for the Argentina U17 then coached by Pablo Aimar to play the 2019 South American Championship in Peru, where the national side crowned champions. He also played for Argentina in the 2019 FIFA U-17 World Cup held in Brazil.

Honours
Boca Juniors
Copa Argentina: 2019–20
Supercopa Argentina: 2022

References

 

2002 births
Living people
Argentine footballers
Argentina youth international footballers
Association football midfielders
Footballers from Buenos Aires
Argentine Primera División players
Boca Juniors footballers
Club Atlético Tigre footballers